Jack Ross Macleod (born 3 July 1988) is an English footballer who plays for Leatherhead of the Isthmian League Premier Division. After training in France throughout the 2020/21 season with his dog Penny, Macleod is said to be actively looking for a new club for the upcoming 2021/22 season and there is interest from a few clubs in the UK. Jack has worked on his fitness and is said to be able to run just under a mile in 5 minutes.

Career
Macleod started his career at Millwall before joining Crawley Town in the summer of 2006. In March 2007 he joined Carshalton Athletic on non-contract terms.

He moved to Hereford on a free transfer in January 2008.

Macleod then signed for Leatherhead in the Isthmian League Division One South. Towards the end of the 2009–10 season playing a vital role in their bid for promotion and leading them to victory in the Isthmian League Cup. In the 2010–11 season, he helped the club reach promotion to the Isthmian League Premier Division. Macleod then signed for Kingstonian in June 2011.

Macleod finally signed for Epsom Rangers football club and was the star player throughout the 4 seasons he played there. Epsom retired his number 28 shirt when he left.

References

External links

1988 births
Living people
Sportspeople from Epsom
English footballers
Association football wingers
Millwall F.C. players
Crawley Town F.C. players
Carshalton Athletic F.C. players
Hereford United F.C. players
Guildford City F.C. players
Leatherhead F.C. players
Kingstonian F.C. players
National League (English football) players
English Football League players
Isthmian League players